Little Theatre or Little Theater may refer to:

Australia
Little Theatre, Adelaide, South Australia
Little Theatre, Sydney, former name of the Royal Standard Theatre, Sydney, New South Wales
Melbourne Little Theatre, an amateur theatre company in Melbourne, Victoria (1931-1950s; later St Martin's Theatre Company)

Canada
 Georgetown Little Theatre, Ontario
 Ottawa Little Theatre, Ontario

India
 The Little Theatre (India), theatre group based in Chennai

Indonesia
 Little Theatre (Indonesia), Jakarta

Ireland
 Athlone Little Theatre

South Africa
 Little Theatre (Cape Town)

United Kingdom

England
 Little Theatre Gateshead
 Little Theatre in the Haymarket, earlier name of the Haymarket Theatre, London
 Little Theatre in the Adelphi, London (1910–1941)
 Little Theatre (Leicester)
 Sheringham Little Theatre, Norfolk

Scotland
 Mull Little Theatre, Scotland

United States
 Little Theatre Movement, in America during the early 20th century
By state and city
 Phoenix Little Theatre, the original name of the Phoenix Theatre, Arizona
 Little Theater, at the UCLA School of Theater, Film and Television, Los Angeles, California
 Little Theatre, at San Diego State University, San Diego, California
 Little Theatre of Jacksonville, the original name of the NRHP-listed Theatre Jacksonville, Florida
 The Little Theatre on the Square, a theater in Sullivan, Illinois
 Marblehead Little Theatre, Massachusetts
 Little Theatre, the former name of Gem Theatre in Detroit, Michigan 
 Las Vegas Little Theater, Nevada
 Albuquerque Little Theatre, New Mexico
 Lucille Ball Little Theatre, in Jamestown, New York
 Little Theatre, the original name of the Hayes Theater in New York City
 Little Theatre (Rochester, New York), NRHP-listed
 Raleigh Little Theatre, North Carolina 
 Chagrin Valley Little Theatre, Chagrin Falls, Ohio
 Little Theatre of Wilkes-Barre, Pennsylvania
 Little Theatre of Alexandria, Virginia
 York Little Theatre, the original name of The Belmont Theatre in York, Pennsylvania

See also

 Le Petit Théâtre (disambiguation), the French equivalent disambiguation page
 Little Theatre Guild of Great Britain
 The Little Theatre of Jean Renoir
 Maly theatre (disambiguation), Russian for The Little Theatre

Lists of theatres

ru:Малый театр (значения)